Sumathi Josephine, better known by her stage name Rekha is an Indian actress who predominantly works in Tamil and Malayalam films. She also starred in few Telugu and Kannada films.She was one of the contestant of Bigg Boss Tamil Season 4.

Career
She was introduced to the Tamil cinema with the film, Kadalora Kavithaigal (1986) directed by Bharathiraja with Sathyaraj in the lead role.

Her notable works include Punnagai Mannan (1986), Enga Ooru Pattukaran (1987), En Bommukutty Ammavukku (1988), Puriyaadha Pudhir (1990) and Gunaa (1991). In Malayalam, Ramji Rao Speaking (1989), Aey Auto (1990) and In Harihar Nagar (1990) were also successful.

She won the Filmfare Award for Best Actress – Malayalam for the film Dasharatham (1989).

After few roles as a heroine, she started to act in character roles, such as sister in law and mother.

In 2020,  she is entering as a contestant in the reality show Bigg Boss 4.

Personal life
Sumathi Josephine born and brought up in Eramalloor, Alappuzha Kerala. She married Harris Kottadath, a Malayali seafood exporter, in 1996. They have a daughter.

Filmography

Tamil

Malayalam

Telugu

Kannada

Hindi

Television

Serials

Shows
{| class="wikitable sortable"
|-
! Year
! Title
! Role
! Channel
! Language
|-
|2010||Rani Maharani||Surya TV||Participant||Malayalam
|-
|2011–2012||Comedy Festival Season 1||Mazhavil Manorama||rowspan=2|Judge||rowspan=8|Malayalam
|-
|2012||Nakshathradeepangal||Kairali TV
|-
|2014||Badai Bungalow||Asianet||Guest
|-
|2016||Comedy Super Nite||Flowers TV||Guest
|-
|2016–2017||Malayali Veetamma||Flowers TV||Judge
|-
|2017||Onnum Onnum Moonu||Mazhavil Manorama||Guest
|-
|2017||Lal Salam||Amrita TV||Guest
|-
|2018||Urvashi Theatres||Asianet||Mentor
|-
|2018||Vanakkam Tamizha||Sun TV||Guest||rowspan=5|Tamil
|-
|2019–2020||Cooku with Comali||rowspan=4|Star Vijay||rowspan=2|Contestant
|-
|2020||Bigg Boss 4
|-
|2021||Bigg Boss Kondattam ||Guest
|-
|2021||Cooku with Comali (season 2) ||Guest
|-
|2021||Red Carpet||Amrita TV||Mentor||rowspan=4|Malayalam
|-
|2022||Top Singer season 2||Flowers TV|| Judge
|-
|2022||Comedy Stars Season 3 ||Asianet||Judge
|-
|}

Awards

 Filmfare Award for Best Actress – Malayalam - Dasharatham''  
Kalaimamani Award by Tamil Nadu Government

References

External links
 

Actresses from Alappuzha
Actresses in Malayalam cinema
Living people
People from Nilgiris district
Actresses in Tamil cinema
Indian film actresses
20th-century Indian actresses
21st-century Indian actresses
Actresses in Telugu cinema
Indian television actresses
Actresses in Malayalam television
Tamil television actresses
Actresses in Kannada cinema
Actresses in Tamil television
Actresses in Telugu television
Bigg Boss (Tamil TV series) contestants
Year of birth missing (living people)